Atiwit "Jazz" Janewattananond (born 26 November 1995) is a Thai professional golfer who plays on both the Asian and European Tours.

Professional career
Janewattananond turned professional in December 2010. In September 2011 he played in his first Japan Golf Tour event, the 2011 Asia-Pacific Panasonic Open, where he made the cut and finished tied for 65th.

Janewattananond achieved his first career win on the Asian Tour in February 2017 at the Bashundhara Bangladesh Open. He won again during the 2018 season at the Queen's Cup in his home county, Thailand. He also qualified for the 2018 Open Championship, but failed to make the cut.

In January 2019, Janewattananond won the SMBC Singapore Open by two shots, a tournament co-sanctioned by the Japan Tour and the Asian Tour. This win brought him into the world top 100 and secured him a place in the 2019 Open Championship. His position in the world top 100 also gave him a place in the 2019 PGA Championship where he finished tied for 14th place. He had been tied for second place after three rounds but a final round 77 dropped him down the field. He won three more Asian Tour events in 2019, winning the Kolon Korea Open in June, the BNI Indonesian Masters and the Thailand Masters in December. His Indonesian Masters win lifted him into the world top-50 for the first time and earned him a place in the 2020 Masters Tournament.

Janewattananond recorded his best finish on the European Tour with a second place finish at the Kenya Savannah Classic in March 2021. He was defeated in a playoff by Daniel van Tonder.

In November 2022, Janewattananond won the International Series Morocco on the Asian Tour. He shot a final-round 67 to claim his seventh Asian Tour title.

Background 
Janewattananond was born in Bangkok, Thailand. His nickname comes from his father, an avid fan of jazz music. At the age of 14 years and 71 days he became the youngest golfer to make the cut on the Asian Tour, which he achieved at the 2010 Asian Tour International in Nakhon Pathom.

Janewattananond took a brief sabbatical from golf at the end of the 2016 European Tour season to join the monkhood, to which he credited the subsequent upturn in his performances on the golf course.

Professional wins (11)

Japan Golf Tour wins (1)

1Co-sanctioned by the Asian Tour

Asian Tour wins (7)

1Co-sanctioned by the Japan Golf Tour
2Co-sanctioned by the Korean Tour

MENA Tour wins (1)

All Thailand Golf Tour wins (3)
2013 Road To Panasonic Open Singha All Thailand Championship
2016 Singha Classic
2017 Singha Classic

Playoff record
European Tour playoff record (0–1)

Results in major championships
Results not in chronological order before 2019 and in 2020.

CUT = missed the half-way cut
"T" indicates a tie for a place
NT = No tournament due to COVID-19 pandemic

Results in World Golf Championships

1Cancelled due to COVID-19 pandemic

NT = No tournament
"T" = Tied

Team appearances
Professional
Amata Friendship Cup (representing Thailand): 2018 (winners)

See also
2017 European Tour Qualifying School graduates
List of golfers with most Asian Tour wins

References

External links

Jazz Janewattananond
Asian Tour golfers
European Tour golfers
Jazz Janewattananond
Golfers at the 2020 Summer Olympics
Jazz Janewattananond
1995 births
Living people